Brush Type 4 may refer to:
 British Rail Class 47
 British Rail Class 48